Chaim Yellin (1912–1944) was a Yiddish poet and leader of the resistance movement in the Kovno Ghetto during the German occupation of Lithuania.

Biography
Haim Yellin was born in the town of Vilkija to a Jewish family. His parents, Eliezer Yellin and Esther Rivel, spoke Hebrew, which was the language of instruction for Jews in the town at the time.

During the First World War, the Jews of Lithuania were expelled by order of the Chief of Staff of the Russian Army in 1915, and his family was pushed to Voronezh. There they witnessed the October Revolution and the Russian Civil War. As a result, his father changed his views considerably and Yiddish became spoken more in their home.

The family returned from Russia to Lithuania in 1921 and settled in Kovno. Upon their return, his father founded a Jewish-general library in the city, which operated alongside the Culture League ( Kultur Lige).

Chaim Yellin was educated and grew up reading a lot, which led to him being known as "The Book" by his friends. During his school career, he had to adjust. In Voronezh he began his studies in Russian. In Kovno, he moved to Yiddish, but because he was not in the fourth grade, he entered the Hebrew Gymnasium where he studied Hebrew until 1932. In addition, his studies at the University of Kovno in the Faculty of Economics was entirely in Lithuanian.

Yellin began publishing theater reviews about performances of Jewish groups in Kovno. He moved from writing on these subjects gradually to reports and descriptions of street life and the market, town and village, and especially the difficult condition of the workers. He was one of the most active members of the left-wing young writers group, and was active in organizing literary and cultural evenings in the fields of literature, theater, music and poetry.

World War II
On June 24, 1941, a year after the Soviet occupation of Lithuania, Nazi Germany occupied Kovno. Yellin and his family tried to escape into the Soviet Union, but were captured by the Germans. They wandered for a while on the roads and forests and eventually came back to Kovno and were sent to the ghetto. While there, Yellin hid under the pseudonym "Kadishon" and disguised his appearance for fear of being captured by the Germans. By October, the Germans had carried out a number of massacres and deportation, and less than half of the Jewish community of Kovno was left, which previously numbered over 40,000.

Three underground resistance groups were known to have been active in the ghetto by the fall of 1941. Yellin was the commander of one of them, which dealt mainly with collecting information on the fronts, providing relief to veterans of the movement, and caring for the children of missing fighters.

In December 1941, the various groups merged into the "Anti-Fascist Struggle Organization." Although he had a lack of experience, Yellin was appointed commander of the organization. At the time of its establishment, the organization's goals were defined: "We shall not abandon the ghetto. Our major aim is the open struggle against the Nazis within partisan ranks." Members of the organization carried out many acts of sabotage, especially at work sites where Jews were sent to forced labor.

In 1943, after many efforts to establish ties, the members of the Anti-Fascist Organization joined the Lithuanian Underground "Union for the War against Fascism in Lithuania," and it was decided to cooperate closely. There were two attempts to establish a partisan base in the forests around Kovno, but these both failed. In September 1943 Yellin went to Vilna, following a letter he had received in the ghetto, in order to contact the parachutist, Gesia Glazer. In the meeting, Yellin received an invitation to one of the partisan bases in eastern Lithuania, and the two went to the forests of Rudniki. At the base, Yellin spent two weeks in which he underwent rapid training.

Death
On April 6, 1944, Yellin was on a mission with a Lithuanian who was an undercover German agent. When the agent tried to stop Yellin, he figured out what was going on, pulled out a revolver and shot the agent. After hearing the commotion, German and Lithuanian soldiers ran after Yellin, and he eventually reached his friends house after jumping fences and running through alleys. After being spotted by the officers as he made it into the house, he shot at both of them again and ran in a different direction. Knowing he couldn't have gone far, Germans called in reinforcements. Since Yellin was out of ammunition, he tried to commit suicide before he could be captured. The Gestapo found him barely alive, and arrested him. Chaim Yellin was eventually executed after weeks of torture and refusing to give the Germans any information.

Family
His brother, Meir Yellin (1910–2000) was a writer and engineer by profession. During the Nazi occupation he was imprisoned in the Kovno Ghetto, but eventually escaped and hid until the city was liberated by the Soviets. Upon the liberation of Kovno, he became the founder of a shelter for Jewish children who survived the Holocaust. He published stories and articles in Lithuania, and later in the Soviet Jewish press about the Holocaust in Lithuania. Among his works: "Partisaner von Kunaser Gette" (in Yiddish: "Partisans in the Kovno Ghetto", Moscow, 1948); "One Night" (in Lithuanian and Russian, 1966); "In the Death Fortresses" (in Lithuanian, 1966).

With his wife, Dweira Yellin-Kormanaite, Meir Yellin had a daughter, Esther Yellin, born in 1940. Esther was a piano student in the legendary master class of Heinrich Neuhaus in Moscow. Today Esther Yellin works as a pianist and piano teacher for professional pianists in Zurich, Switzerland.

See also
 Holocaust in Lithuania
 Kovno Ghetto
 George Kadish

References

1912 births
1944 deaths
Lithuanian Jews
Jewish resistance members during the Holocaust
Jewish poets
Yiddish-language poets
Jewish martyrs
European Ashkenazi Jews